The Girls' discus throw at the 2013 World Youth Championships in Athletics was held on 10 July.

Medalists

Records 
Prior to the competition, the following records were as follows.

Qualification 
Qualification rule: 48.50 (Q) or at least 12 best performers (q) qualified.

Final

References 

2013 World Youth Championships in Athletics